Steve Gunderson is an American politician from Montana. Gunderson serves as a Republican member of the Montana House of Representatives from District 1, including Libby, Montana.

Early life 
On May 31, 1957, Gunderson was born in Seattle, Washington.

In 1975, Gunderson graduated from Libby High School in Libby, Montana.

Career 
Gunderson served in the Montana Army National Guard and North Dakota Army National Guard for eight years. He served as a Staff Sergeant, Combat Engineer Senior NCO.

Gunderson is a retired businessman in Montana. Gunderson owned a RadioShack store, bail bondsman service, and a storage unit business in Libby, Montana.
Gunderson is the cofounder of Montanore  Positive Action Committee, an advocacy group.

On November 8, 2016, Gunderson won the election and became a Republican member of Montana House of Representatives for District 1. Gunderson defeated Donald Coats with 72.50% of the votes. On November 6, 2018, as an incumbent, Gunderson won the election and continued serving District 1. Gunderson defeated Donald Coats with 72.94% of the votes.

Gunderson is also a member of the Libby Asbestos Superfund Advisory Team.

Personal life 
Since 1979, Gunderson has been a resident of Libby, Montana. Gunderson's wife is Cherie Gunderson. They have two sons, Dustin and Jason.

See also 
 Montana House of Representatives, District 1

References

External links 
 Montana Primary Elections Result at nytimes
 Steve Gunderson at ourcampaigns.com
 Steve Gunderson at powervoter.us
 Steve Gunderson at ballotpedia.org

1957 births
Living people
People from Libby, Montana
Politicians from Seattle
Republican Party members of the Montana House of Representatives
Military personnel from Montana
Military personnel from North Dakota
21st-century American politicians